Senator Ernst may refer to:

Joni Ernst (born 1970), U.S. Senator from Iowa since 2015
Richard P. Ernst (1858–1934), U.S. Senator from Kentucky from 1921 to 1927